Cassandra Davis-Patton  (born July 31, 1964) is an American actress best known for her role as Ella Payne on Tyler Perry's House of Payne and its spin-off series The Paynes. She is also known as Aunt Bam in the Madea franchise since 2010. She has starred in several other productions under the direction of Tyler Perry.

Life and career
Born in Holly Springs, Mississippi, Davis attended Spelman College in Atlanta and majored in music. She left the college one credit short of graduation, because she was not allowed to perform religious music during her senior recital. Davis returned to Spelman in 2008 to complete her degree, graduating in November of that year. She has credited her devout, born-again Christian faith as the main reason behind her professional success.

Davis' acting career began in 1988 with a supporting role in the Spike Lee comedy film School Daze. Her early television credits include appearances on Living Single, Married... with Children, Kenan & Kel, and The PJ's. She established her acting career by appearing in Tyler Perry productions such as Madea's Family Reunion, Madea Goes to Jail, Daddy's Little Girls, Madea's Big Happy Family, Boo! A Madea Halloween and A Madea Family Funeral.

Davis is best known for her role as Ella Payne in the TBS sitcom Tyler Perry's House of Payne from 2007 to 2012. She received two NAACP Image Award for Outstanding Actress in a Comedy Series for her performance. In 2018, she starred in House of Payne spinoff The Paynes that aired on Oprah Winfrey Network. In 2020, a revival series of House of Payne was ordered on BET.

Personal life
Davis married her longtime boyfriend Kerry Patton on January 11, 2017; prior to their marriage, the two had been dating since 2007. In an interview, Cassi denied having a stroke, but revealed instead that she was diagnosed with Bell's palsy in March 2020.

Filmography

Films and plays

Television

Awards and nominations

References

External links
 

1964 births
African-American Christians
Actresses from Mississippi
American film actresses
American stage actresses
American television actresses
Living people
Spelman College alumni
People from Holly Springs, Mississippi
20th-century American actresses
21st-century American actresses
African-American actresses
American voice actresses